Narragh and Reban West (sometimes spelled Rheban) is a barony in County Kildare, Ireland.

Etymology
The barony takes its name from the village of Narragh (from Irish an fhorrach, "the meeting-place") and Rheban Castle (ríogh-bábhún, "king's bawn").

Location
Narragh and Reban West is located in southwest County Kildare.

History
Narragh and Reban West were part of the ancient lands of the Ua Tuathail (O'Tooles) before the 13th century, retaken in the 14th. There were originally two separate baronies, united by 1572, and then divided into east and west baronies before 1807.

List of settlements

Below is a list of settlements in Narragh and Reban West:
Athy
Kilberry

References

Baronies of County Kildare